Ralph Henry Massy-Westropp (born Worcester, England 23 April 1864, died County Clare, Irish Free State 30 June 1932) was an Irish rugby international. He won one cap against England in 1886.

Notes

References
R. H. Massy-Westropp at Scrum.com
IRFU Profile

1864 births
1932 deaths
Irish rugby union players
Ireland international rugby union players
Monkstown Football Club players
Rugby union players from Worcester
Rugby union forwards